The Statue of Krishna, Greater Noida is an upcoming 108 foot statue of the major Hindu deity Krishna in Gaur Yamuna City, Greater Noida, Uttar Pradesh, India.

References 

Krishna in art
K
K
Proposed infrastructure in Uttar Pradesh